Hermine Villinger (February 9, 1849 – March 3, 1917) was a German novelist and short-story writer, who also wrote using the pseudonym H. Willfried. She was known for her stories of village life, in the German literary genre known as Dorfgeschichte.

Life
Hermine Villinger was born on February 9, 1849, in Freiburg. She was a friend of the Austrian writer Marie von Ebner-Eschenbach. She died on March 3, 1917, in Karlsruhe.

Works
 Der lange Hilarius, 1885.
 Sommerfrischen, 1887.
 Schwarzaldgeschichten, 1892.
 Unter Bauern und andere Geschichten. 1894.
 Mutter und Tochter, 1905.
 Die Dachprinzeß, 1908.

References

1849 births
1917 deaths
19th-century German novelists
19th-century German short story writers
19th-century pseudonymous writers
German women novelists
German women short story writers
Pseudonymous women writers